Zaza is a 1939 American romantic drama film made by Paramount Pictures, and directed by George Cukor. The screenplay was written by Zoë Akins, based on the play Zaza. The music score is by Frederick Hollander. The film stars Claudette Colbert (who had replaced Isa Miranda) and Herbert Marshall.

The story was filmed by Paramount in a 1915 version with Pauline Frederick, and previously remade in 1923 with Gloria Swanson.

Premise
A glamorous female singer (Colbert) has an affair with a married man (Marshall).

Cast
Claudette Colbert as Zaza
Herbert Marshall as Dufresne
Bert Lahr as Cascart
Helen Westley as Anais
Constance Collier as Nathalie
Genevieve Tobin as Florianne
Walter Catlett as Marlardot
Ann E. Todd as Toto
Rex O'Malley as Bussy
Ernest Cossart as Marchand
Rex Evans as Michelin
Robert Fischer as Pierre
Janet Waldo as Simone
Dorothy Tree as Madame Dufresne
Duncan Renaldo as Animal trainer

References

External links
 
 
 

1939 films
1939 romantic drama films
American romantic drama films
American black-and-white films
Films directed by George Cukor
Films set in the 1890s
Films set in France
Paramount Pictures films
American films based on plays
Films with screenplays by Jules Furthman
Remakes of American films
American remakes of French films
Sound film remakes of silent films
1930s English-language films
1930s American films